Lovise "Louise" Kristine Petersen (later Riisbek, later Brandt, 8 April 1894 – 3 August 1983) was a Danish diver who competed in the 1920 Summer Olympics. She was born in Copenhagen and died in Frederiksberg. In 1920 she was eliminated in the first round of the 10 metre platform competition.

References

External links
Profile
Professional PADI Education

1894 births
1983 deaths
Danish female divers
Olympic divers of Denmark
Divers at the 1920 Summer Olympics
Divers from Copenhagen